Gelang Patah is a suburb in Iskandar Puteri, Johor Bahru District, Johor, Malaysia. It was administered by ruling coalition, Barisan Nasional for over 5 decades until the 13th Malaysian General Elections.

One of its schools, Sekolah Menengah Kebangsaan Gelang Patah is also featured in the School Programme by its government.  The town is well-known for its otak-otak and seafood.

Politics
There are 2 constituencies under Gelang Patah Parliamentary which makes the total voters for this Chinese populated area is about 92 thousand people.

In 2013 general election, Barisan Nasional fielded the incumbent Johor Menteri Besar, Abdul Ghani Othman to contest in Gelang Patah against Democratic Action Party Supremo, Lim Kit Siang, a two-term member of parliament for Ipoh Timur. Lim won the election with a majority of 14,762 votes, defeating Abdul Ghani who captured 39,522 votes.

The DAP veteran then expressed disappointment over Prime Minister Najib Abdul Razak's decision not to admit former Johor "Menteri Besar" Abdul Ghani Othman into his new cabinet.

It is most unfair and ungrateful for Umno leaders to drop Ghani like a tonne of bricks after he failed to defeat me in Gelang Patah," said Lim.

Sime Darby said Ghani will be appointed as an independent and non-executive director. He had served as the Johor "Menteri Besar" for four terms lasting 18 years.

In the last general election in 2008, Barisan's Tan Ah Eng from the MCA retained the Gelang Patah seat by 8,851-vote majority. defeating Parti Keadilan Rakyat's (PKR) Dr Zaleha Mustafa who captured 24, 779 votes, a strong sign that the opposition is making its way.

Administration
Kota Iskandar in Iskandar Puteri, the new administration center for Johor Bahru replacing Bukit Timbalan in the heart of Johor is undergoing rapid developments. Multiple large-scale projects were kick-started by the 5th Prime Minister Abdullah Badawi and the town subsequently became a gold mine for ambitious international brands such as Legoland, Hotel Jen Puteri Harbour, San Rio Hello Kitty Town and Frost & Sullivan to benefit from the Iskandar Development Territory. Abdullah's intention was to generate massive Foreign Direct Investment especially from neighbouring country, Singapore, and also the middle eastern countries.

With the target to inflow more than RM100 billion FDI under the belt of Iskandar Region Development Authority (IRDA) and with the help of the Federal Government investment arm, Khazanah Nasional Berhad and the Johor State Government, Gelang Patah significantly shifted from being a shantytown to a town of opportunity as it became flooded by foreign companies, foreign forces and expatriates. However, this resulted in an increase in living costs in Gelang Patah.

Transportation

Bus terminals in Gelang Patah are the GP Sentral and Gelang Patah bus terminals.

Residences 
Forest City is a real estate megaproject on the slopes of Gelang Pata. It is an integrated residential development and private town.

Education

Primary school

Sekolah Kebangsaan Tiram Duku
Sekolah Kebangsaan Tanjung Kupang
Sekolah Kebangsaan Tanjong Adang
Sekolah Kebangsaan Taman Nusa Perintis
Sekolah Kebangsaan Sikijang
Sekolah Kebangsaan Pendas Laut
Sekolah Kebangsaan Nusantara
Sekolah Kebangsaan Morni Pok
Sekolah Kebangsaan Ladang Pendas
Sekolah Kebangsaan Kompleks Sultan Abu Bakar
Sekolah Kebangsaan Kampung Pulai
Sekolah Kebangsaan Gelang Patah
Sekolah Jenis Kebangsaan (Tamil) Gelang Patah
Sekolah Jenis Kebangsaan (Cina) Ming Terk

Secondary school

Sekolah Menengah Kebangsaan Tanjung Adang
Sekolah Menengah Kebangsaan Taman Nusajaya
Sekolah Menengah Kebangsaan Kompleks Sultan Abu Bakar
Sekolah Menengah Kebangsaan Gelang Patah

See also
 Iskandar Malaysia
 Iskandar Puteri
 Kota Iskandar
 Nusa Bayu

References

Iskandar Puteri
Towns and suburbs in Johor Bahru District
Townships in Johor